Matej Pučko (born 6 October 1993) is a Slovenian professional footballer who plays as a winger.

References

External links

NZS profile 

1993 births
Living people
People from Murska Sobota
Slovenian footballers
Slovenia youth international footballers
Slovenia under-21 international footballers
Slovenian expatriate footballers
Association football wingers
NK Aluminij players
FC Koper players
CA Osasuna players
Real Oviedo players
Korona Kielce players
Tuzlaspor players
Bandırmaspor footballers
Slovenian Second League players
Slovenian PrvaLiga players
Segunda División players
Ekstraklasa players
TFF First League players
Slovenian expatriate sportspeople in Spain
Expatriate footballers in Spain
Slovenian expatriate sportspeople in Poland
Expatriate footballers in Poland
Slovenian expatriate sportspeople in Turkey
Expatriate footballers in Turkey